The hot nose sign refers to increased perfusion in the nasal region on nuclear medicine cerebral perfusion studies in the setting of brain death. The absent or reduced flow in the internal carotid arteries is thought to lead to increased flow within the external carotid arteries and subsequent increased perfusion in the nasal region.

References 

Medical aspects of death
Signs of death
Radiologic signs